William Edward Murray AM (16 February 192021 April 2013) was an Australian bishop of the Roman Catholic Church.

Murray was born in Leichhardt and was ordained as a priest on 21 July 1945 in the Archdiocese of Sydney. He was appointed bishop of the Diocese of Wollongong on 5 June 1975 and consecrated on 21 July 1975. Murray remained with the diocese until his retirement on 12 April 1996.

He was awarded a Member of the Order of Australia on 26 January 1988 for services to religion.

Murray died on 21 April 2013 at a Sydney nursing home. He was 93.

References

External links
Catholic Hierarchy website
Diocese of Wollongong website

20th-century Roman Catholic bishops in Australia
1920 births
2013 deaths
Members of the Order of Australia
Roman Catholic bishops of Wollongong